Dante's Inferno is the first part of Dante Alighieri's 14th-century epic poem Divine Comedy.

Dante's Inferno may also refer to:

Film
 L'Inferno, a 1911 Italian silent film by Giuseppe de Liguoro, loosely adapted from the Divine Comedy
 Dante's Inferno (1924 film), a silent film about a slum landlord sent to hell
 Dante's Inferno (1935 film), a film based around a fairground attraction depicting the inferno
 Dante's Inferno (1967 film), a television film about the tortured life of Dante Gabriel Rossetti
 Dante's Inferno (2007 film), a puppet comedy film version of Dante's hell

Other uses
 Inferno, a modern retelling of Inferno, written by Larry Niven and Jerry Pournelle
 Dante's Inferno (ride), created 1971, was located at Coney Island, New York, US
 Dante's Inferno, a 1993 album by Transmetal
 "Dante's Inferno" (song), a 1995 song by Iced Earth
 Dante's Inferno (video game), 2010 game based on Alighieri's poem
 Dante's Inferno: An Animated Epic, 2010 direct to DVD film based on the video game

See also
 Inferno (disambiguation)